The Bang Kham River is a short tributary of the Lopburi River. It originates in Ban Mi district, Lopburi Province. It flows southward and tributes the Lopburi River in Tha Wung district.

Rivers of Thailand